Timo Juhani Kalli (born 22 February 1947 in Kiukainen, now Eura, Satakunta) is a Finnish former politician from the Centre Party. He is a farmer by profession.

Kalli was a member of parliament between 1991 and 2019, and held the position of the speaker of the parliament for a short period in 2007 following that year's general elections. He was also the chairman of Center Party parliamentary group between 2003 and 2011.

References

1947 births
Living people
People from Eura
Centre Party (Finland) politicians
Speakers of the Parliament of Finland
Members of the Parliament of Finland (1991–95)
Members of the Parliament of Finland (1995–99)
Members of the Parliament of Finland (1999–2003)
Members of the Parliament of Finland (2003–07)
Members of the Parliament of Finland (2007–11)
Members of the Parliament of Finland (2011–15)
Members of the Parliament of Finland (2015–19)